Myosin, light chain 12B, regulatory is a protein that in humans is encoded by the MYL12B gene. The gene is also known as MLC-B and MRLC2. The activity of nonmuscle myosin II is regulated by phosphorylation of a regulatory light chain, such as MYL12B. This phosphorylation results in higher ATPase activity and the assembly of myosin II filaments.

References

Further reading 
 

Human proteins